James "Jim" Wathigo Mburu, (born May 21, 1985), better known by his stage names Jimwat (stylized Jimw@t) and Jimweezy, is a Kenyan genge rapper.

Personal life
The name Jimwat is coined from his names, James Wathigo. He was brought up in Kabete, Nairobi, Kenya and went to Musa Gitau Primary School and Kikuyu day secondary School, Thogoto. After his O levels he took a computer course and later studied graphic design. He started rapping while he was in Class 7.

Music career
While still in Form 4, Jimwat went to Calif Records and recorded his first song, Sema Nami Sweetie (Sheng for talk to me sweetie). It was not released until he completed his O levels. On clearing high school, Jimwat released it and he was shocked to hear it on 98.4 Capital FM a few days after its release. Later, other stations followed suit. The same year, he was featured by Rhaptaz, (a group composed of Gabu of P-Unit) in Paulina which became a club hit and was used in the Close-Up Dance-o-Mania competition. He also did videos for the songs that same year. Later on, he was featured in the song Adila by Pararo and Riziki. He was also featured in Jua Cali’s Kwa Album Yangu (Sheng for In My Album) and Wanakimbia (Kiswahili for They're Running), which are in Juacalisekta, a mini album by Jua Cali. He then went on to pursue a solo career. In the same year, he released his most popular single to date, Under 18, in which he featured Meg C in the video.

Other songs he has worked on are Mpaka Che with Pilipili, Tunakatika (Sheng for We're Dancing) with Wambo-E and Chakula Kinywaji (Kiswahili for Food Drink) with Jua Cali, which was featured in his album Ngeli ya Genge. Jua Cali's single, Sitoi Kitu Kidogo(Kiswahili for I am not bribing), also featuring Jimwat, addresses the issue of corruption in Kenya and was included in the National Anti-Corruption Steering Campaign in 2008.

In 2009, he was involved in a UN peace campaign where he collaborated in a peace song with artists Jua Cali, Mejja, Nyota Ndogo, Mr Lenny among other top artists in Kenya. He also worked on an anti-corruption song, Simama, (Kiswahili for Stand Up) with top Kenya artists. He later released a mellow jam, Fall in Love. His latest release, entitled Fan Wangu (Sheng for My Fan), is a dedication to his loyal fans.

Jimwat is set to release an album entitled Genge Nijenge! (Kiswahili for Build Me Genge!). Jimwat is working with artists such as Das Walanguzi , Jedidah and Pace Kenya among others as he betters his musical career.
Jimwat took a hiatus from Music scene but got back as of 2019 he has new Genge #EduTainment Songs.

Awards

References

External links
 https://www.youtube.com/channel/UCA6BcDDqT14PUokn7v1soKA
 https://www.reverbnation.com/jimwat
 https://dailyactive.info/2019/05/04/why-rapper-jimwat-is-an-inspiration-to-young-artistes

1985 births
Living people
Kenyan rappers
Kenyan musicians